The Marvell–Elaine School District #22 (MESD) previously Marvell School District No. 22, is a school district headquartered in Marvell, Arkansas. It serves Marvell, Elaine, and other areas in Phillips and Desha counties.

On July 1, 2006, the Elaine School District merged into the Marvell School District.

Facilities
The district administration building is directly behind a Citgo gas station, near the intersection of U.S. Highway 49 and North Pine.

 Marvell Primary School, serving prekindergarten through grade 5.
 Marvell High School, serving grades 6 through 12.

Both are located on U.S. Route 49, the main highway passing through Marvell.

References

Further reading
These include maps of predecessor districts:
 2006-2007 School District Map of the State of Arkansas
 2004-2005 School District Map of the State of Arkansas
 (Download)
 (Download)

External links

 Marvell-Elaine School District
 Marvell-Elaine School District (170.211.217.197/wordpress/)
  (old page)

Education in Monroe County, Arkansas
Education in Phillips County, Arkansas
School districts in Arkansas
2006 establishments in Arkansas
School districts established in 2006